Czelin  is a village in the administrative district of Gmina Mieszkowice, within Gryfino County, West Pomeranian Voivodeship, in north-western Poland, close to the German border.

The village has a population of 420.

The landmarks of Czelin are the medieval Our Lady of Częstochowa church and the Monument to the first Polish border post on the Oder river.

History
In the Early Middle Ages, it was a Slavic settlement and stronghold, which became part of the emerging Polish state under its first ruler Mieszko I of Poland in 963. During its history it formed part of the Kingdom of Poland, Margraviate of Brandenburg, Czech Kingdom, Teutonic Order, Brandenburg again, Prussia and Germany from 1871 to 1945, before becoming again part of Poland after the defeat of Nazi Germany in World War II. It is a former town, as it enjoyed town rights from the 14th to the 18th century. Czelin is best known as the place where the first Polish border post on the Odra River was erected in 1945 in the final stages of World War II.

References

Czelin